The Hong Kong Civile Party is a Hong Kong political party established in March 2021. It was founded by a localist scholar Chin Wan and a group of young Hong Kong people who support localism in Hong Kong.

Foundation 
The Hong Kong Civile Party opened a Facebook page on 28 February 2021, and issued a party creation statement on 1 March, which officially began operations.

The term "citizen" in the party name is taken from the term "Civile" during the Roman Empire, which means that the people who live there can be safe and profitable, take care of the dignity and interests of the suzerain, do things in harmony, and do what is good.

Goals 
The Hong Kong Civile Party advocates the implementation of the Basic Law and "One Country, Two Systems", and is committed to safeguarding Hong Kong's status as the Asia-Pacific financial center, giving full play to Hong Kong's special status and role within the framework of mainland China, and improving the current international trade relations between the People's Republic of China and other countries in the world.

See also 

 Chin Wan
 Hong Kong Autonomy Movement

References

External links 

 Facebook page
 Instagram page

Political parties established in 2021
2021 establishments in Hong Kong
Political parties in Hong Kong